Yunieski Gonzalez (born July 5, 1985) is a Cuban boxer who fights in the light heavyweight division. Gonzalez amassed a record of 345–27 while fighting for the Cuban amateur team before moving to Miami in 2010. He made his professional debut later that year with a first round knock-out victory against Ramon Adorno.

Gonzalez suffered his first defeat in July 2015 after a controversial points loss to Jean Pascal.

On August 4, 2015 he was ranked 9th Light Heavyweight by RING magazine.

Professional boxing record

References

External links
 

1985 births
Living people
Defecting sportspeople of Cuba
Light-heavyweight boxers
Cuban male boxers
People from Pinar del Río
Sportspeople from Miami